Bryan Fuller (born July 27, 1969) is an American television writer and producer who has created a number of television series, including Dead Like Me, Wonderfalls, Pushing Daisies, Hannibal, and American Gods. Fuller worked as writer and executive producer on the Star Trek television series Voyager and Deep Space Nine; he is also the co-creator of Star Trek: Discovery.

Early life
Fuller was born in Lewiston, Idaho, but raised in Clarkston, Washington. He was brought up Roman Catholic. After graduating from Clarkston High School, Fuller attended Lewis–Clark State College in Lewiston. He later transferred to the USC School of Cinematic Arts, but dropped out and began working as an office temp.

Career
As a contributing writer, Fuller's work has been featured on several shows, including Star Trek: Voyager and Star Trek: Deep Space Nine, earning twenty-two episode writing credits for the Star Trek franchise. Fuller is himself a fan of science fiction, and in an interview said that his favorite Star Trek series were the 1960s original, followed by Deep Space Nine, The Next Generation and Voyager. Fuller has called DS9 his favorite spin-off, stating: "There were lots of new and innovative things going on during Deep Space Nine and that's why it's my favorite of the new series. It was much more character-based". Fuller worked on the DS9 episodes "The Darkness and the Light" and "Empok Nor".

Fuller wrote the teleplay for the 2002 adaptation of Carrie, based on the novel of the same name by Stephen King. Next, he created Dead Like Me which ran on Showtime for two seasons from 2003 to 2004, although Fuller left early into the first season. He then co-created Wonderfalls with Todd Holland, which ran on Fox in 2004, with only four episodes being aired and the rest premiering on DVD. Near the end of 2004, Fuller got a pilot commitment from NBC for The Assistants, although the show never got past the script stage. In 2005, Fuller wrote the pilot to the animated comedy The Amazing Screw-On Head for the Sci Fi Channel, which aired in 2006 but was not picked up for a series. He next worked on NBC series Heroes, where he joined as a consulting producer after the pilot and became a co-executive producer for the first season. He also wrote a couple episodes for Heroes, including "Company Man" which TV Guide named one of the 100 greatest episodes in television history.

Next he created Pushing Daisies, about a pie-maker (Lee Pace) who can bring dead things back to life temporarily, debuted on ABC on October 3, 2007. On July 17, 2008, the show was nominated for twelve Emmy Awards from the Academy of Television Arts & Sciences, including one for Fuller for Outstanding Writing of a Comedy Series. It ultimately won seven Emmy Awards: for Best Supporting Actress (Kristin Chenoweth), Best Art Direction, Best Costume, Best Music, Best Make-Up, Best Editing, and Best Direction of a Comedy Series (Barry Sonnenfeld). The second season of Pushing Daisies began October 1, 2008, on ABC. In mid-November, ABC announced that it would not order new episodes for season two after the 13th. The series' final episode aired on June 13, 2009.

With the cancellation of Pushing Daisies, Fuller signed a seven-figure, two-year deal with Universal Media Studios. He rejoined the writing staff of Heroes for the 20th episode of the third season, and again became a consulting producer, playing a "key role" on the writing staff. After working on some of the story arcs for the next season of Heroes, Fuller announced he was moving on to other projects. His next projects, both a result of the Universal deal and developed for NBC, were Sellevision, developed with Bryan Singer and based on the book of the same name by Augusten Burroughs, and No Kill, Fuller's first sitcom. Neither project got past the scripting stage. Fuller's next project, again for NBC, was Mockingbird Lane, a revival of the classic sitcom The Munsters. A pilot was produced, but the show did not receive a series order, and the pilot aired as a Halloween special. Fuller next worked on Mind Fields with Lisa Joy for USA Network, which was not picked up.

Fuller owns Living Dead Guy Productions.

Fuller's next project was the Hannibal Lecter series Hannibal, which premiered on NBC in 2013, and renewed for a second season in 2014. Fuller had developed High Moon for Syfy, based on the book The Lotus Caves, which filmed a pilot in late 2013, but was not given a series order.

By July 2014, Starz had acquired the airing rights to the novel American Gods, and that Fuller, with producer Michael Green, would develop the novel into a television series. The show premiered April 30, 2017. The show was renewed for a second season, but Fuller and Green left the show due to budgetary issues during the writing stage of the second season. In early 2018, Fuller was working on a television adaptation of The Vampire Chronicles novel series by Anne Rice. He dropped out of the project in July of the same year. After leaving American Gods and Discovery, Fuller began work on his first feature film in 2021, writing a new adaptation of the Stephen King novel Christine for Sony Pictures and Blumhouse Productions, planning to make his directorial debut.

Fullerverse
Nicknamed the "Fullerverse" by Fuller's fans, all of Fuller's series are implied to take place in the same universe.

Marianne Marie Beetle (played by actress Beth Grant) first appears in the Wonderfalls episode "Muffin Buffalo", and has subsequently appeared in the Pushing Daisies episode "Comfort Food" and in the pilot of Mockingbird Lane.

Similarly, Gretchen Speck-Horowitz (played by Chelan Simmons) first appears in the Wonderfalls episode "Pink Flamingos" and subsequently appeared in the Hannibal episode "Amuse-Bouche", reverting to her maiden name after her divorce.

Meanwhile, in the Pushing Daisies episode "Bzzzzzzzzz!", Ned mentions that he works for Happy Time Temp Agency when trying to go undercover, the same place where Georgia "George" Lass works in Dead Like Me.

Also, the fictional brand "Lil' Ivey's" first appeared in the Wonderfalls episode "Cocktail Bunny" on a box of cocktail cherries and later appeared in the Pushing Daisies episode "Kerplunk", this time on a bag of macaroni.

Fuller has reinterpreted a few of his characters in later series. Georgia "George" Lass (played by Ellen Muth), having first appeared in Dead Like Me, was reinterpreted as Georgia Madchen (also played by Muth) in the Hannibal episodes "Buffet Froid" and "Relevés". This similarity is furthered by their last names: "lass" is an English synonym for girl while "Mädchen" is a German word meaning the same. In another nod to Georgia Lass being a reaper (therefore both dead and alive) in Dead Like Me, in Hannibal Georgia Madchen is a killer who suffers from numerous medical conditions including Cotard's syndrome, a delusion disorder that has her convinced she is actually dead. 

In a similar manner, Reggie Lass from Dead Like Me (played by Britt McKillip) was reinterpreted as Miriam Lass (played by Anna Chlumsky), who first appears in the Hannibal episode "Entrée". Similarly, in the Hannibal episode "Takiawase", an acupuncturist (played by Amanda Plummer) who is under investigation for lobotomizing patients is named Katherine Pimms, which is also the cover name used by Charlotte "Chuck" Charles (played by Anna Friel) in multiple episodes of Pushing Daisies.

A visual nod to Wonderfalls was given in the Heroes first-season episode "Better Halves" when the smoosh-faced wax lion central to Wonderfalls was seen on a bedside table.

Personal life
Fuller is in a long-term relationship with interior designer Scott Roberts.

In a 2007 interview, he stated that his favorite film was the 2001 French film Amélie, which was one of the inspirations for Pushing Daisies: "All the things I love are represented in that movie. It's a movie that will make me cry based on kindness as opposed to sadness."

Television credits

Award and nominations

References

External links

 
 
 

1969 births
American male screenwriters
American television producers
American television writers
American gay writers
Lewis–Clark State College alumni
LGBT Christians
LGBT Roman Catholics
LGBT people from Idaho
Living people
American male television writers
People from Lewiston, Idaho
People from Clarkston, Washington
USC School of Cinematic Arts alumni
Screenwriters from Washington (state)
Screenwriters from Idaho
21st-century LGBT people